Institute of Cytology and Genetics of the Siberian Branch of the Russian Academy of Sciences is a research institute based in Novosibirsk, Russia. It was founded in 1957.

Experiments
 Fox domestication experiment

Magazines
 Vavilov's Journal of Genetics and Breeders
 Ateroskleroz
 The Siberian Scientific Medical Journal

Monuments and memorials
 Monument to the laboratory mouse
 Memorial to Dmitriy Belyaev and Domesticated Fox

Gallery

References

External links
 Adopt a Pet Fox, for Science's Sake. Live Science.
  
  

C
Biological research institutes
Genetics or genomics research institutions
Research institutes in the Soviet Union
Institutes of the Russian Academy of Sciences
Science and technology in Siberia
Research institutes established in 1957
Sovetsky District, Novosibirsk
1957 establishments in the Soviet Union